Yoast United is a Dutch basketball club based in Bemmel, Gelderland. Established in 2020, the team plays in the BNXT League, the highest level of basketball in the Netherlands. Home games are played at De Kooi, which has a capacity of 650 people.

History
The organization was founded in May 2020 under the temporary name of Basketball Community Gelderland with the aim of bringing back professional basketball to the province of Gelderland. Since the folding of Matrixx Magixx in 2014, the province had been without a club in the first-tier Dutch Basketball League (DBL).

On 5 August, the club announced it was taking the step to the DBL and had acquired a provisional license for the 2020–21 season. On 9 August, the club announced Matthew Otten as its first head coach. On 13 August, the club signed its first player in American Kaleb Warner. Yoast SEO signed a three-year contract to become main sponsor of the team, which was named Yoast United. On 4 October, Yoast United won its first-ever DBL game away against BAL Weert, 91–59.

United had an incredible 2021 Dutch Cup campaign in its debut season. It defeated favored Donar and Landstede Hammers in the quarter- and semifinals. Point guard Austin Luke, also assists leader of the DBL, led the team with 52 points in the semifinal that was won after overtime. In the final, Yoast lost to eight-seeded BAL.

Starting from the 2021–22 season, United plays in the BNXT League, in which the national leagues of Belgium and the Netherlands are combined. Head coach Otten signed with Donar Groningen, and Paul Vervaeck signed a 2-year contract to become his successor.

Arena
Yoast United plays its games at Sportcentrum De Kooi, which had been used by amateur club Batouwe Basketball before as well. With a capacity of 650 people, it is the smallest arena in the BNXT League.

Players

Current roster

Depth chart

Notable players

 Andrés Ibargüen (1 season: 2020–21)
 Austin Luke (1 season: 2020–21)

Individual awards
DBL All-Rookie Team
Bob Berghuis – 2021

Honours
DBL Cup
Runners-up (1): 2021

Season by season

Sponsorship

Head coaches

References

External links
Official website (in Dutch)
Twitter profile
Yoast SEO

Basketball teams established in 2020
Basketball teams in the Netherlands
Dutch Basketball League teams
Sports clubs in Lingewaard